

List of Ambassadors

Oded Joseph (Non-Resident, Nairobi) 2019 - 
Noah Gal Gendler (Non-Resident, Nairobi) 2017 - 2019
Jacob Keidar (Non-Resident, Nairobi) 2007 - 2011
Aharon Ofri 1968 - 1971
Uri Lubrani 1965 - 1967
Michael Michael (diplomat) 1962 - 1965

References

Uganda
Israel